Virgibacillus sediminis is a Gram-positive, moderately halophilic, strictly aerobic and alkalitolerant bacterium from the genus of Virgibacillus which has been isolated from sediments from the Keke salt lake in the Qaidam Basin in China.

References

Bacillaceae
Bacteria described in 2009